Lac La Biche is a community in Alberta, Canada. The name may refer to:
Lac La Biche, Alberta, the hamlet (formerly a town) in northeastern Alberta,
Lac La Biche County, the specialized municipality comprising the former town and the former Lakeland County,
Lac la Biche (Alberta), the lake adjacent to the community, or
Lac La Biche Airport, an airport within Lac La Biche County.

Several provincial electoral districts have also borne the name:
Lac La Biche (provincial electoral district), from 1952 to 1971,
Lac La Biche-McMurray, from 1971 to 1986,
Athabasca-Lac La Biche, from 1986 to 1993,
Lac La Biche-St. Paul, from 1993 to 2012,
Lac La Biche-St. Paul-Two Hills, from 2012 to 2019,
Fort McMurray-Lac La Biche, from 2019 to present.